The following is an alphabetical list of articles related to Tokelau.

A
 Administrator of Tokelau
 Afua (islet)
 Ahua
 Apia, Tokelau
 Atafu
 Avakilikili
 Awtano

B
 Badge of Tokelau

C

D
 David Payton
 Duncan MacIntyre (New Zealand politician)

E
 Education in Tokelau

F
 Fakaofo
 Fale, Tokelau
 Falima Teao
 Fatigauhu
 Fenua Fala
 Fenua Loa
 Flag of Tokelau
 Foua Toloa

G
 Guy Powles

H
 Health care in Tokelau
 Hemoana Stadium

I
 Internet in Tokelau
 ISO 3166-2:TK

J
 Jonathan Kings
 John Allen (diplomat)

K
 Kerisiano Kalolo
 Kolouei O'Brien
 Kuresa Nasau

L
 Lalo, Tokelau
 Languages of Tokelau
 Laulauia
 List of birds of Tokelau
 List of butterflies of Tokelau
 List of heads of government of Tokelau
 List of mammals of Tokelau
 List of newspapers in Tokelau
 List of villages in Tokelau
 Literacy in Tokelau
 Loimata Iupati
 Luana Liki Hotel

M
 Matangi, Tokelau
 Motu Akea
 Motufala
 Motuhaga
 Mulifenua
 Music of Tokelau

N
 Neil Walter
 Niututahi
 Nukulakia
 Nukumatau
 Nukunonu

O

P
 Patuki Isaako
 Pio Tuia
 Public holidays in Tokelau
 Punalei

Q

R
 Religion in Tokelau
 Roman Catholic Mission Sui Iuris of Tokelau
 Russell Marshall

S
 Salesio Lui
 Saumagalu
 Saumatafanga Smoking in Tokelau

T
 Taulagapapa
 Te Fakanava
 Te Kamu
 Te Puka e Mua
 Te Puku
 Te Vaka
 Te Vakai
 Teafua
 Telephone numbers in Tokelau
 Television in Tokelau
 Tinielu Tuumuli
 .tk
 Tokelau
 Tokelau (islet)
 Tokelau Scholarship Scheme
 Tokelauan language
 Tokelauan people
 Treaty of Tokehega
 Tui Tokelau

U

V

W

X

Y

Z

See also

 Lists of country-related topics
 Outline of Tokelau

  
 Tokelau